The Slănic is a left tributary of the river Vărbilău in Romania. It discharges into the Vărbilău in Vărbilău.

References

Rivers of Romania
Rivers of Prahova County